Flávio Migliaccio (26 August 1934 – 4 May 2020) was a Brazilian actor, film director and screenwriter. He appeared in more than 90 films and television shows between 1958 and 2019. His 1962 film The Beggars was entered into the 3rd Moscow International Film Festival. His elder sister Dirce Migliaccio was also an actress.

Migliaccio was found dead by his property caretaker at his farm in Rio Bonito, Rio de Janeiro, on 4 May 2020, aged 85. According to Military Police of Rio de Janeiro State, he left a suicide note and hanged himself.

Selected filmography

 O Grande Momento (1958)
 Cinco vezes Favela (1962) – João (segment "Um favelado")
 The Beggars (1963)
 My Home Is Copacabana (1965)
 Canalha em Crise (1965)
 The Hour and Turn of Augusto Matraga (1965) – Quim Recadeiro
 Todas as Mulheres do Mundo (1966) – Edu
 Cuidado, Espião Brasileiro em Ação (1966)
 Entranced Earth (1967) – Common people man
 Arrastão (1967)
 O Homem Que Comprou o Mundo (1968) – José Guerra
 O Homem Nu (1968)
 A Penúltima Donzela (1969) – The Priest
 Pobre Príncipe Encantado (1969)
 Máscara da Traição (1969) – Correia
 Como Vai, Vai Bem? (1969)
 A Cama Ao Alcance de Todos (1969) – The Beggar
 O Donzelo (1970) – Nestor
 Quatro Contra o Mundo (1970) – (segment "História da Praia")
 Vida e Glória de um Canalha (1970)
 Uma Garota em Maus Lençóis (1970)
 Parafernália o Dia de Caça (1970)
 Pais Quadrados... Filhos Avançados (1970)
 Em Busca do Su$exo (1970)
 Pra Quem Fica, Tchau (1971) – Chuca
 Roberto Carlos a 300 Quilômetros por Hora (1971) – Luigi
 Os Caras de Pau (1971)
 Como Ganhar na Loteria sem Perder a Esportiva (1971)
 Aventuras com Tio Maneco (1971) – Tio Maneco
 Assalto à Brasileira (1971) – Zeca
 Os Machões (1972) – Chuca
 Um Virgem na Praça (1973) – José
 O Filho do Chefão (1974)
 O Caçador de Fantasma (1975) – Tio Maneco
 Maneco, o Super Tio (1978) – Tio Maneco
 Sítio do Picapau Amarelo (1978) – Ptolomeu
 A Noiva da Cidade (1978)
 Parceiros da Aventura (1980) – Marcelo
 Pra Frente, Brasil (1982)
 Tanga (1987) – Partido Comunista Tanganês
 Rainha da Sucata (1990) – Osvaldo Moreiras (Seu Moreiras)
 A Próxima Vítima (1995, TV Series) – Vitinho Giovanni
 Boleiros: Era Uma Vez o Futebol... (1998) – Naldinho
 Menino Maluquinho 2: A Aventura (1998)
 Sítio do Picapau Amarelo (2004–2006) – Iaú / Eremita 
 Boleiros 2: Vencedores e Vencidos (2006) – Naldinho
 Os Porralokinhas (2007) – Tio Maneco
 Verônica (2008) – Seu Luís
 Caminho das Índias (2009, TV Series) – Karan Ananda
 The Dognapper (2013) – Seu João
 Êta Mundo Bom! (2016, TV Series) – Josias
 Jovens Polacas (2019) – Mr. Abrahão

References

External links

1934 births
2020 deaths
2020 suicides
Brazilian male film actors
Brazilian film directors
Brazilian screenwriters
Male actors from São Paulo
Suicides by hanging in Brazil
People from Rio Bonito, Rio de Janeiro